The Graham-Gaughan-Betts House is a historic house at 710 Washington Street in Camden, Arkansas.  The two story wood-frame house was built in 1858 by Major Joseph Graham.  It is particularly notable for its well-preserved interior woodwork, and its elaborately decorated front porch.

The house was listed on the National Register of Historic Places in 1974. It was later listed as a contributing property to the Washington Street Historic District.

See also
National Register of Historic Places listings in Ouachita County, Arkansas

References

Houses on the National Register of Historic Places in Arkansas
Houses completed in 1858
Houses in Ouachita County, Arkansas
Individually listed contributing properties to historic districts on the National Register in Arkansas
Buildings and structures in Camden, Arkansas
National Register of Historic Places in Ouachita County, Arkansas
1858 establishments in Arkansas